Glacial Lake Glendive was a glacial lake on the lower Yellowstone River. It formed in the valley of Yellowstone, during the late Pleistocene epoch south of the Keewatin Ice Sheet. As the ice sheet retreated northward, the lake drained into the modern Missouri River.

Ice of the Keewatin Lobe of the Laurentide Ice Sheet advanced westward into the Missouri and Yellowstone river valleys. The Glasgow sublobe blocked the Missouri River west of present-day Fort Peck, Montana, and created Lake Jordan and glacial lakes Circle and Lambert were formed to the east. The Yellowstone lobe spread south past Intake, Montana, and formed glacial Lake Glendive. At its maximum the ice may have blocked the Little Missouri River forming glacial Lake Mikkelson.  When the ice sheet began to retreat northward, the southwestern margin of abandonment its previous drainages and lakes formed in the depression along the ice margins. Melting of the Shelby and Havre lobes in western Montana led to the retreat of the ice into Alberta. By 16,200 B.C. the ice had created glacial Lake Carmichael in the area of the Cypress Hills. By 15,700 B.C. ice-free conditions may have existed in southwestern Saskatchewan north of Havre, Montana.

References

Alden, W. C., 1958, Physiography And Glacial Geology Of Eastern Montana And Adjacent Areas, U. S. Geological Survey Professional Paper 174.
Colton, R. B., Lemke, R. W., and Lindvall, R. M., 1961, Glacial map of Montana East of the Rocky Mountains, U. S. Geological Survey Miscellaneous Geological Investigations Map I-327.
Howard, A. D., 1958, Drainage Evolution In Northeastern Montana and Northwestern North Dakota, Bulletin of the Geological Society of America, v69, 575-588.
Lemke, R. W., Laird, W. M., Tipton, M. J., and Lindvall, R. M., 1965, Quaternary Geology Of Northern Great Plains, in Wright, H. E., Jr., and Frey, D. G., Eds, The Quaternary of the United States, Princeton University Press, Princeton, NJ.
Lindvall, R. M., 1962, Geology Of The Eagle Buttes Quadrangle, Chouteau County, Montana, U. S. Geological Survey Miscellaneous Geological Investigations Map I-349.
Thornbury, W. D., 1965, Regional Geomorphology Of The United States, John Wiley & Sons, Inc., New York.
Trimble, D. E., 1980, The Geologic Story Of The Great Plains, Geological Survey Bulletin 1493.
Wayne, W. J., Aber, J. S., Agard, S. S., Bergantino, R. N., Bluemle, J. P., Coates, D. A., Cooley, M. E., Madole, R. F., Martin, J. E., Mears, B., Jr., Morrison, R. B., and Sutherland, W. M., 1991, Quaternary Geology Of The Northern Great Plains, in The Geology of North America, Vol K-2, Quaternary Nonglacial Geology: Conterminous U. S., The Geological Society of America.

See also
List of prehistoric lakes
Proglacial lakes of the Missouri River Basin
Lake Cut Bank
Lake Chouteau
Lake Great Falls
Lake Musselshell
Lake Jordan.
Lake Circle
Lake Glendive
Lake McKenzie

Glendive
Geology of Montana
Glendive
Natural history of Montana
Glendive
Yellowstone River